Kevin Wade may refer to:

 Kevin Wade (born 1954), American screenwriter and television producer
 Kevin Wade (footballer) (1922–2001), Australian rules footballer